K-4 is the longest designated state highway in Kansas, at . It begins north of Scott City at U.S. Route 83 (US-83) and travels eastward to US-59 near Nortonville in northeast Kansas. A segment of the highway in Saline County overlaps Interstate 135 (I-135) and US-81, and a section in Topeka runs concurrent with I-70. It also intersects several other major highways, including US-283 in Ransom, US-183 in La Crosse, US-281 in Hoisington, US-77 in Herington, I-470 and US-75 in Topeka, and US-24 northeast of Topeka.

K-4 was first designated by KDOT in 1927, and at that time ran from K-1 (now U.S. Route 183) in La Crosse eastward to the Missouri state line by Atchison. By 1932, the highway was extended westward along the former alignment of K-52 to its current western terminus. Then in December 1994, K-4 was truncated to US-59 in Nortonville.

Route description

Western Kansas

K-4 runs to the north of K-96 between its western terminus and the K-14 junction in Rice County. The route begins in rural Scott County at an intersection with U.S. Route 83. Sixteen miles (26 km) east of here, it passes through the town of Healy. About  further east, it has a  concurrency with K-23. From here, K-4 continues east as it serves the towns of Shields, Utica, Arnold, before reaching Ransom, where it intersects US-283. After passing through Brownell, K-4 serves as the southern terminus of K-147. K-4 then turns southward to bisect McCracken before turning to the east to cross US-183 in La Crosse, the county seat of Rush County.

From La Crosse, K-4 heads due east, running through Otis as it approaches the Barton County line. It then meets US-281 in a T-intersection and begins an overlap with it. This overlap carries the two routes through to Hoisington, where they split up. K-4 then runs through Redwing and Claflin. East of Claflin, K-4 has a full folded diamond interchange with K-156.  K-4 bypasses Bushton (which can be accessed via K-171) and cuts through Frederick before having a junction with K-14. It then runs just north of Geneseo and along the Rice/Ellsworth County line. The highway then moves fully into Ellsworth County, where it meets the south end of K-141.

Central Kansas
K-4 then enters McPherson County. It runs just north of Marquette, which lies at the opposite end of the former K-175, before heading towards downtown Lindsborg. In Lindsborg, K-4 encounters former US-81 Business, before heading north out of town and into Saline County. It then heads north in a concurrency with I-135 and US-81. K-4 merges onto the northbound freeway at exit 78, then splits off again at exit 82. The highway then bypasses Assaria to the west before heading north to spawn a child route, K-104, after which it turns due east once again. K-4 next serves Gypsum and Carlton before intersecting K-15. It then continues east to Hope, serving as the southern terminus for K-43 in the latter.

K-4 then runs north of the town of Herington. Near Herington, K-4 junctions with two north–south highways that connect through town: K-218 and US-77. Also near Herington, K-4 gets within  of US-56, but never actually intersects it. It then zig-zags northeast through Latimer before turning north at the northern end of K-149. The roadway then runs through White City and Dwight, where it intersects K-57. K-4 then has a brief concurrency with K-177, and  after that concurrency ends, it forms another one with K-99. The two routes split apart in Eskridge. It then serves Dover before merging onto eastbound I-70 which is concurrent with US-40.

The freeway then enter the state capital, Topeka. The next interchange, is for I-470 and is also where US-75 joins, forming a four-way overlap. US-75 then splits off on its own freeway at exit 358A. The freeway then snakes around downtown Topeka. At the East Topeka interchange, the Kansas Turnpike joins the mainline, and I-70 merges onto it. US-40 and K-4 split off to the north to their own freeway.

East of Topeka
US-40 splits off K-4 at the first interchange north of I-70. K-4 then downgrades to a Super-2 freeway. The next interchange (with Seward Avenue) serves Philip Billard Municipal Airport. K-4 then crosses the Kansas River and merges onto the US-24 expressway before splitting off again at the next interchange. K-4 then returns to its normal rural highway configuration.

K-4 then curves southeast of Meriden (the former state route K-245 existed to connect the town to K-4 until dissolved in 2014). It then passes the west end of K-92 near Rock Creek. It then has a brief overlap with K-16 in the Valley Falls area. K-4 then angles northeast to pass just south of Nortonville. Finally, K-4 comes to an end at US-59 just southeast of Nortonville.

History

Original alignment
K-4 was first designated by KDOT in 1927, and at that time began at K-1 (now US-183) in La Crosse. From La Crosse, K-4 followed its current alignment east to Herington. Past Herington, K-4 continued east on US-50N (now US-56) to Council Grove, where it then followed a series of now unnumbered roadways to rejoin its present alignment at Eskridge. From Eskridge to west of Topeka, K-4 was identical to its current routing; however, at the intersection of SW Auburn Road and SW 21st Street, where K-4 currently continues north to access I-70, K-4 turned east, following SW 21st Street into Topeka. At Topeka Boulevard, K-4 turned north, following the street out of the city.

K-4 remained on Topeka Boulevard north to an intersection with NE 82nd Street south of the Shawnee–Jackson county line. K-4 headed east on 82nd to Meriden, where it rejoined its modern routing near the modern intersection of K-4 and Butler Road east of Meriden. From Meriden to Valley Falls, K-4 did not follow its current alignment. Instead of bypassing Rock Creek, K-4 continued into Rock Creek on (what is now) Rock Creek Rd. K-4 continued North and curved to the east on 114th. From there K-4 continued east until Decatur Rd. where it curved back to the North. From there it continued north until curving back to the east on 134th, continuing on to Edwards Road where it curved to the north. From there K-4 went north to 142nd before curving back to the east. From here, it continued on to Valley Falls.

Past Valley Falls, K-4 followed 162nd Street and modern K-16 east to Osage Road, where the route intersected K-16. At the time, K-4 and K-16 overlapped northward along Osage Road to Nortonville, then followed the modern alignments of US-159 and K-116 to Cummings. Between Cummings and Atchison, K-4 and K-16 zig-zagged across several roadways surrounding the current alignment of US-59 before joining the modern routing of US-59 just west of Atchison. In Atchison, K-16 split from K-4 and headed northward on modern K-7 while K-4 continued to the Missouri state line on current US-59.

Extensions and realignments

By 1932, K-4 was extended westward from La Crosse, along the former K-52, to US-83 north of Scott City. Then in a May 5, 1940 resolution, it was extended  farther west to meet a new alignment of US-83. From Herington to Eskridge, as well as between Topeka and Meriden, the modern routing of K-4 was unnumbered. Past Meriden, most of K-4's current roadway was unbuilt.

In a June 19, 1936 resolution, K-4 was realigned slightly within La Crosse, which eliminated a short overlap with K-1 (modern US-183). In an August 7, 1941 resolution, the highway was realigned to the south of Ransom, which eliminated two railroad crossings. In a separate August 7, 1941 resolution, K-4 was realigned from Shields northeastward to Pendennis to eliminate four sharp curves. In a June 5, 1945 resolution, K-4 was realigned Healy to east end of overlap with K-23. This realignment also eliminated a few railroad crossings. In a June 5, 1946 resolution, K-4 was realigned slightly north by Otis to eliminate two railroad crossings. In a June 24, 1953 resolution, K-4 was realigned slightly west, from Langley to northwest of Marquette. In a February 25, 1953 resolution, it was realigned from the former curve north of Bushton to K-14 east of frederick. This created an overlap with K-14 to meet its old alignment. Then in a July 14, 1954 resolution, K-4 was realigned slightly north, to the north side of Geneseo. This realignment also eliminated the overlap with K-14. Before 1956, K-4 originally followed US-50N (now US-56) from Herington to Council Grove, then northeast along now locally maintained highways to Eskridge. Then in a February 9, 1956 resolution, it was realigned to follow and replace K-10 to K-99, then continue east to meet its old alignment in Eskridge. In a October 6, 1958 resolution, K-4 and US-59 was realigned between Cummings and Atchison to eliminate several sharp curves. Then in a July 10, 1957 resolution, K-4 and US-59 was realigned further southwestward from Cummings to Nortonville. In a February 25, 1959 resolution, K-4 was realigned between Meriden and Valley Falls to remove some dangerous curves.

In a March 22, 1960 resolution, K-4 Alternate was to be established from K-4 north to US-40 and I-70, west of Topeka. But then in a July 11, 1962 resolution, it was rescinded and K-4 had been extended north to US-40 and I-70 along the proposed K-4 Alternate. In an August 10, 1960 resolution, K-4 and US-59 was realigned to the east of Nortonville, and US-159 alternate was created. Then roughly 20 years later, K-4 Alternate was created and replaced US-159 Alternate. K-4 originally travelled west from Meriden to US-75, which it then followed south to US-24 in Topeka. Then in a December 4, 1963 resolution, it was realigned to continue south from Meriden to US-24, then followed US-24 west into Topeka. In an April 21, 1967 resolution, K-4 and K-16 was realigned in and around Valley Falls to make way for the new Perry Reservoir. Also at this time a short K-4 spur was created, and when extended was to become a new alignment of K-4 between Valley Falls and Nortonville. In a September 9, 1969 resolution, K-4 was realigned slightly within Lindsborg and onto US-81. In a January 4, 1982 resolution, US-81, along K-4 from Lindsborg to US-81 in Bridgeport, was redesignated as US-81 Business. In an October 10, 1991 resolution, K-4 was extended south from US-24 to US-40 west of Tecumseh.

Between 1968 and 1997, K-4 was aligned along US-75 between I-70/US-40 and US-24 and then US-24 in Topeka. In 1997, the Oakland Expressway, serving eastern Topeka, was opened and K-4 gained its current route through Topeka. On December 1, 1994, K-4's eastern terminus was truncated to US-59 in Nortonville.

Future
In May 2020, KDOT's Eisenhower Legacy Transportation Plan was announced.

Major intersections

Alternate route

K-4 Alternate is a  alternate route of K-4 that serves Nortonville. It begins at K-4 and travels north to an intersection with US-159. At US-159, K-4 Alt. turns eastward and the two highways run east together and end at an intersection on the east Nortonville city line at US-59. K-4 Alt. was designated on April 1, 1981, and its alignment has not changed since.

See also

References

External links

 K-4 at Route56.com

004
Transportation in Scott County, Kansas
Transportation in Lane County, Kansas
Transportation in Ness County, Kansas
Transportation in Rush County, Kansas
Transportation in Barton County, Kansas
Transportation in Rice County, Kansas
Transportation in Ellsworth County, Kansas
Transportation in McPherson County, Kansas
Transportation in Saline County, Kansas
Transportation in Dickinson County, Kansas
Transportation in Morris County, Kansas
Transportation in Wabaunsee County, Kansas
Transportation in Shawnee County, Kansas
Transportation in Jefferson County, Kansas
U.S. Route 56
U.S. Route 159
U.S. Route 59